The U-boat Campaign from 1914 to 1918 was the World War I naval campaign fought by German U-boats against the trade routes of the Allies. It took place largely in the seas around the British Isles and in the Mediterranean.
The German Empire relied on imports for food and domestic food production (especially fertilizer) and the United Kingdom relied heavily on imports to feed its population, and both required raw materials to supply their war industry; the powers aimed, therefore, to blockade one another. The British had the Royal Navy which was superior in numbers and could operate on most of the world's oceans because of the British Empire, whereas the Imperial German Navy surface fleet was mainly restricted to the German Bight, and used commerce raiders and unrestricted submarine warfare to operate elsewhere.

In the course of events in the Atlantic alone, German U-boats sank almost 5,000 ships with nearly 13 million gross register tonnage, losing 178 boats and about 5,000 men in combat. Other naval theatres saw U-boats operating in both the Far East and South East Asia, the Indian Ocean and the Mediterranean and North Seas.

1914: Initial campaign

North Sea: Initial stage

In August 1914, a flotilla of ten U-boats sailed from their base in Heligoland to attack Royal Navy warships in the North Sea in the first submarine war patrol in history. Their aim was to sink capital ships of the British Grand Fleet, and so to reduce the Grand Fleet's numerical superiority over the German High Seas Fleet. The first sortie was not a success. One of U-9's engines broke down and she had to return to Heligoland. Two of the ten U-boats were lost.

Later in the month, the U-boats achieved success, when  sank the cruiser . In September,  sank three armoured cruisers (and ) in a single action. Other successes followed. In October U-9 sank the cruiser  and U-27 sank the submarine E3, the first time one submarine sank another, and on the last day of the year  sank the pre-dreadnought battleship .  By the end of the initial campaign, the U-boats had sunk nine warships while losing five of their own number.

Mediterranean: Initial stage

The initial phase of the U-boat campaign in the Mediterranean comprised the actions by the Austro-Hungarian Navy's U-boat force against the French, who were blockading the Straits of Otranto. At the start of hostilities, the Austro-Hungarian Navy had seven U-boats in commission; five operational, two training; all were of the coastal type, with limited range and endurance, suitable for operation in the Adriatic. However during the war new larger U-boats came into service plus Germany shipped several overland. The Austro-Hungarian U-boats had a number of successes.

Submarine warfare
In 1914 the U-boat's chief advantage was to submerge; surface ships had no means to detect a submarine underwater, and no means to attack even if they could, while in the torpedo the U-boat had a weapon that could sink an armoured warship with one shot. Its disadvantages were less obvious, but became apparent during the campaign. While submerged, the U-boat was virtually blind and immobile; boats of this era had limited underwater speed and endurance, and so needed to be in position before an attack took place, while even on the surface their speed (around 15 knots) was less than the cruising speed of most warships and two-thirds that of the most modern dreadnoughts.

The U-boats scored a number of impressive successes, and were able to drive the Grand Fleet from its base in search of a safe anchorage, but the German Navy was unable to erode the Grand Fleet's advantage as hoped. Also, in the two main surface actions of this period the U-boat was unable to have any effect; the High Seas Fleet was unable to draw the Grand Fleet into a U-boat trap. Whilst warships were travelling at speed and on an erratic zigzag course they were relatively safe, and for the remainder of the war the U-boats were unable to mount a successful attack on a warship travelling in this manner .

First attacks on merchant ships
The first attacks on merchant ships had started in October 1914. At that time there was no plan for a concerted U-boat offensive against Allied trade.  It was recognised the U-boat had several drawbacks as a commerce raider, and such a campaign risked alienating neutral opinion. In the six months to the opening of the commerce war in February 1915, U-boats had sunk 19 ships, totalling  .

1915: War on commerce

Unrestricted submarine warfare

By early 1915, all the combatants had lost the illusion that the war could be won quickly, and began to consider harsher measures in order to gain an advantage.

The British, with their overwhelming sea power, had established a naval blockade of Germany immediately on the outbreak of war in August 1914, and in early November 1914 declared it to be a war zone, with any ships entering the North Sea doing so at their own risk. The blockade was unusually restrictive in that even food was considered "contraband of war". The Germans regarded this as a blatant attempt to starve the German people into submission and wanted to retaliate in kind, and in fact the severity of the British blockade did not go over well in America either.

Germany could not possibly deal with British naval strength on an even basis, and the only possible way Germany could impose a blockade on Britain was through the U-boat. The German Chancellor, Theobald von Bethmann Hollweg, felt that such a submarine blockade, based on "shoot without warning", would antagonise the United States and other neutrals. However, he was unable to hold back the pressures for taking such a step.

In response to the British declaration in November 1914 that the entire North Sea was now a war zone, on 4 February 1915 Admiral Hugo von Pohl, commander of the German High Seas Fleet, published a warning in the Deutscher Reichsanzeiger (Imperial German Gazette):

 In time, this would bring non-European nations (such as Brazil and the United States) into the war.

The German U-boat force was now primarily based at Ostend in Belgium, giving the submarines better access to the sea lanes around England. The Germans made use of this advantage, sending out about 20 U-boats to begin the naval blockade. In January, before the declaration of "unrestricted submarine warfare" as the submarine blockade was called, 43,550 tonnes of shipping had been sunk by U-boats. The number of sinkings then steadily increased, with 168,200 tonnes going down in August. Attacking without warning, German U-Boats sank nearly 100,000 GRT per month, an average of 1.9 ships daily.

On 10 April 1915 the British steamer Harpalyce, a Belgian relief ship and clearly marked as such, was torpedoed without warning by  near the North Hinder lightship, just outside the strip of sea declared safe by von Pohl.

RMS Lusitania

Of the 1,959 people aboard, 1,198 were killed, 128 of them US citizens.

Following the incident, the German government attempted to justify it with a range of arguments; nevertheless there was massive outrage in Britain and America, and the British felt that the Americans had to declare war on Germany. However, US President Woodrow Wilson refused to overreact, though some believed the massive loss of life caused by the sinking of Lusitania required a firm response from the US. 

When Germany began its U-boat campaign against Britain, Wilson had warned that the US would hold the German government strictly accountable for any violations of American rights. Backed by State Department second-in-command Robert Lansing, Wilson made his position clear in three notes to the German government issued on 13 May, 9 June, and 21 July.

The first note affirmed the right of Americans to travel as passengers on merchant ships and called for the Germans to abandon submarine warfare against commercial vessels, whatever flag they sailed under.

In the second note Wilson rejected the German arguments that the British blockade was illegal, and was a cruel and deadly attack on innocent civilians, and their charge that Lusitania had been carrying munitions. Secretary of State William Jennings Bryan considered Wilson's second note too provocative and resigned in protest after failing to have it moderated.

The third note, of 21 July, issued an ultimatum, to the effect that the US would regard any subsequent sinkings as "deliberately unfriendly". While the American public and leadership were not ready for war, the path to an eventual declaration of war had been set as a result of the sinking of Lusitania.

Submarine minelayers
The appearance of new minefields off the east coast of Britain in June 1915 puzzled the Royal Navy due to the waters being very busy, and was blamed initially on neutral fishing boats.

On 21 August  became the first submarine minelayer to penetrate into the English Channel, laying 12 mines off Boulogne, one of which sank the steamship William Dawson the same day. UC-5 laid 6 more mines off Boulogne and Folkestone on 7 September, one of which sank the cable layer Monarch.

SS Arabic and a pause in unrestricted warfare 
He fired a single torpedo which struck the liner aft, and she sank within 10 minutes, with the loss of 44 passengers and crew, 3 of whom were American. Following speculation that the US would sever relations with Germany,
on 28 August the Chancellor issued new orders to submarine commanders and relayed them to Washington. The new orders stated that until further notice, all passenger ships could only be sunk after warning and the saving of passengers and crews. On September 1st the unrestricted submarine warfare doctrine was essentially abandoned. This proved unacceptable to the Naval High Command, and on 18 September the High Seas flotillas were withdrawn from the commerce war.

Dardanelles Operations
The German Navy sent their first submarines to the Mediterranean in response to the Anglo-French Dardanelles campaign, after it became obvious that their Austro-Hungarian allies could do little against it with their small submarine force, which nevertheless was successful in defending the Adriatic.

By the end of June 1915, the Germans had assembled a further three prefabricated Type UB I submarines at Pola, two of which were to be transferred to the Austro-Hungarian Navy. They were also assembling three Type UC I minelaying submarines, which were ordered converted into transports to carry small quantities of critical supplies to Turkey.

Mediterranean operations
The Mediterranean was an attractive theater of operations to the  German Naval Command; a significant proportion of British imports passed through it, it was critical to French and Italian trade, and submarines would be able to operate effectively in it even in autumn and winter when poor weather hampered Atlantic and North Sea operations. Additionally, there were certain choke points through which shipping had to pass, such as the Suez Canal, Malta, Crete, and Gibraltar. Finally, the Mediterranean offered the advantage that fewer ships of neutral powers  (such as the US or Brazil) would be encountered.

Throughout the summer, the German navy assembled a force of 4 U-boats at Cattaro for operations against commerce in the Mediterranean. The campaign got underway in October 1915, when U-33 and U-39, followed later by U-35, were ordered to attack the approaches to Salonika and Kavalla. That month, 18 ships were sunk, for a total of 63,848 tons. It was decided the same month that further reinforcements were called for, and the large U-boat,  sailed for Cattaro. Since Germany was not yet at war with Italy, even though Austria was, German U-boats were ordered to refrain from attacking Italian shipping in the eastern Mediterranean. When operating in the west, up to the line of Cape Matapan, German U-boats flew the Austrian flag, and a sinking without warning policy was adopted, since large merchant ships could be attacked on the suspicion of being transports or auxiliary cruisers.

The German Admiralty also decided that the Type UB II submarine would be ideal for Mediterranean service. Since these were too large to be shipped in sections by rail to Pola like the Type UB I, the materials for their construction and German workers to assemble them were sent instead. This meant a shortage of workers to complete U-boats for service in home waters, but it seemed justified by the successes in the Mediterranean in November, when 44 ships were sunk, for a total of 155,882 tons. The total in December fell to 17 ships (73,741 tons) which was still over half the total tonnage sunk in all theaters of operation at the time.

In November 1915, U-38 caused a diplomatic incident when she sank the Italian steamer  while sailing under the Austrian flag, and the loss of nine American citizens caused the "sinking without warning" policy to be suspended in April 1916 until the resumption of unrestricted submarine warfare in 1917. A similar incident in March 1916 became a contributing factor in Italy's decision to declare war on Germany in August 1916.

Central countermeasures

Allied countermeasures during this period had mixed success.

Defensive measures, such as arming merchant ships, and advising them to either run, or turn towards the U-boat in order to ram, or force it to submerge, were the most effective.
From arming ships for self-defence, the next step was arming ships for the purpose of engaging the U-boats in gun battles; two U-boats were sunk in 1915 whilst attacking trawlers so fitted. The following step was to arm and man ships with hidden guns to do so, the so-called Q ship. A variant on the idea was to equip small vessels with a submarine escort. In 1915, two U-boats were sunk by Q-ships, and two more by submarines accompanying trawlers.

Offensive measures were less effective; efforts were made to use nets to find submerged U-boats, and explosive sweeps to destroy them, but these were largely failures.
Attempts were also made to close routes like the Straits of Dover with boom nets and minefields, the so-called Dover Barrage; to lay minefields around U-boat bases, and station submarines on patrol to catch them leaving or entering port. These measures required a huge expenditure of effort and material, but met with little success. Just two U-boats were sunk by these measures in 1915.

At the beginning of this period the British Merchant Marine had a shipping fleet totaling of 21 million GRT.
In six months of unrestricted submarine warfare U-boats sank  million tons of Allied shipping, scarcely denting the British merchant fleet; whilst new building, and additions from ships seized, had more than made up this loss.
On the other hand, serious offence had been given to neutrals such as Norway and the Netherlands, and brought the United States to the brink of war. This failure, and the various restrictions imposed on the U-boat Arm in the Atlantic area largely brought the campaign there to a halt, although it continued with little hindrance in the Mediterranean and elsewhere, where there was less likelihood of offending neutrals.

Given the ineffectiveness of early countermeasures, in 1917 Britain and in 1918 America adopted dazzle camouflage to attempt to reduce shipping losses to torpedoes. The results in both cases were inconclusive.

Depth charges

The depth charge, or "dropping mine" as it was initially named, was first mooted in 1910, and developed into practicality when the British Royal Navy's Commander in Chief, Admiral of the Fleet Sir George Callaghan, requested its production in 1914. Design work was carried out by Herbert Taylor at HMS Vernon Torpedo and Mine School in Portsmouth, England, and the first effective depth charge, the "Type D", became available in January 1916.

Anti-submarine vessels initially carried only two depth charges, to be released from a chute at the stern of the ship.

1916: The High Seas Fleet; Mediterranean, American, Arctic and Black Sea waters

In support of the High Seas Fleet
In 1916 the German Navy again tried to use the U-boats to erode the Grand Fleet's numerical superiority; they staged operations to lure the Grand Fleet into a U-boat trap. Because the U-boats were much slower than the battle fleet, these operations required U-boat patrol lines to be set up in advance; then the battle fleet manoeuvred to draw the Grand Fleet onto them.

Several of these operations were staged, in March and April 1916, but with no success. Ironically, the major fleet action which did take place, the Battle of Jutland, in May 1916, saw no U-boat involvement at all; the fleets met and engaged largely by chance, and there were no U-boat patrols anywhere near the battle area. A further series of operations, in August and October 1916, were similarly unfruitful, and the strategy was abandoned in favor of resuming commerce warfare.

The British were well aware of the risk of U-boat traps to the Grand Fleet, although they had no means of knowing where these might lie. However Jellicoe had developed a tactical response to the problem (which, in the event, was never tested). Faced with a German fleet that turned away, he would assume a submarine trap, and decline to follow, but would move at high speed to the flank, before deploying or opening fire; the aim of this would be to fight the battle away from the ground chosen by his enemy, and forcing any U-boats present to surface if they intended to follow.

Mediterranean waters
During 1916 the commerce war continued unabated in the Mediterranean. Allied countermeasures were largely ineffective; the complex arrangements for co-operation between the various navies meant a fragmented and unco-ordinated response, while the main remedy favored by the Allies for the U-boat menace, the Otranto Barrage, was of little value.

Just two U-boats were caught in the barrage in all the time it was in operation; meanwhile merchant shipping suffered huge losses. In 1916 the Allies lost 415 ships, of 1,045,058 GRT, half of all Allied ships sunk in all theatres.

Eight of the top dozen U-boat aces served in the Pola flotilla, including the highest scoring commander of all, Lothar von Arnauld de la Perière.

American waters
In 1916 the Germans completed two submarine merchant vessels, to be used as blockade runners. The aim was to use them to carry high value goods to neutral nations such as the US, which still maintained a strict neutrality, and was prepared to trade with Germany as with any other nation. The first of these vessels, Deutschland, sailed in summer 1916 and made a favorable impact on US public opinion. She made a second equally successful voyage in autumn of that year. Her sister, Bremen, was less fortunate; she disappeared on her maiden voyage, the cause of her loss unknown.

A less favorable impression was made by the cruise of   under K/L Hans Rose. After refuelling at Newport, Rhode Island, Rose raided Allied shipping off the coast of Canada and the United States. Although this was in international waters, and Rose scrupulously followed international law, the action was seen as an affront to the US, particularly when US warships were forced to stand aside while merchant ships nearby were sunk.

Arctic waters
In autumn 1916, U-boats of the High Seas flotilla attacked shipping bound for Russia. Five U-boats operated in the Barents Sea between North Cape and the Kola inlet. Also, the two UE1-class minelaying boats laid minefields in the White Sea. These boats sank 34 ships (19 of them Norwegian) before winter ice closed the area for operations.

One of the ships sunk near the Norwegian coast was the Romanian merchant Bistrița, sunk by U-43 on 11 November. Before sinking the ship, the captain of the U-boat allowed the ship's crew to take refuge in his submarine, then later he handed over the crew to a Russian sailing ship which took them to Vardø. From there, they were eventually repatriated.

Black Sea waters
The Constantinople Flotilla was established in May 1915 and operated U-boats in the Black Sea. Bulgaria joined the campaign in May 1916, when the German submarine UB-8 was commissioned by the Bulgarian Navy as Podvodnik. In three years of operation, the Flotilla sank ships totalling 117,093 GRT.

UB-45 was lost in November 1916 and UB-46 in December, both sunk by Russian mines. In addition, UB-7 was reportedly sunk by Russian aircraft in October.

Throughout September and October 1916, the main task of the submarines UB-42 and UB-14 was patrolling the Russian and Romanian coasts, from Constanța to Sevastopol. On 30 September 1916, near the port of Sulina, UB-42 launched a torpedo at the Romanian torpedo boat Smeul, but missed. The Romanian warship counterattacked, damaging the submarine's periscope and conning tower and forcing her to retreat. In November, the German submarine UC-15 was sent on a minelaying mission off Sulina and never returned, being sunk by her own mines. This was probably caused by an encounter with Smeul, whose captain surprised a German submarine near Sulina in November 1916, the latter reportedly never returning to her base at Varna, Bulgaria. This could only be UC-15, whose systems most likely malfunctioned after being forced to submerge in the shallow waters, upon encountering the Romanian torpedo boat.

1917: Resumption of unrestricted submarine warfare

On 22 December 1916, Admiral von Holtzendorff composed a memorandum which became the pivotal document for Germany's resumption of unrestricted U-boat warfare in 1917. Holtzendorff proposed breaking Britain's back by sinking 600,000 tons of shipping per month, based on a February 1916 study by Dr. Richard Fuss, who had postulated that if merchant shipping was sunk at such a rate, Britain would run out of shipping and be forced to sue for peace within six months, well before the Americans could act. Even if the "disorganized and undisciplined" Americans did intervene, Holtzendorff assured the Kaiser, "I give your Majesty my word as an officer, that not one American will land on the Continent."

On 9 January 1917, the Kaiser met with Chancellor Bethmann Hollweg and military leaders at Schloss Pless to discuss measures to resolve Germany's increasingly grim war situation; its military campaign in France had bogged down, and with Allied divisions outnumbering German ones by 190 to 150, there was a real possibility of a successful Allied offensive. Meanwhile, the German navy was bottled up in its home port of Kiel, and the British blockade had caused a food scarcity that was in turn causing deaths due to malnutrition. The military staff urged the Kaiser to unleash the submarine fleet on shipping travelling to Britain, Hindenburg advising the Kaiser that "The war must be brought to an end by whatever means as soon as possible." On 31 January, the Kaiser duly signed the order for unrestricted submarine warfare to resume effective 1 February; Bethmann Hollweg, who had opposed the decision, said "Germany is finished".

On 27 January, Admiral Beatty observed that "The real crux lies in whether we blockade the enemy to his knees, or whether he does the same to us."

Germany had 105 submarines ready for action on 1 February: 46 in the High Seas Fleet; 23 in Flanders; 23 in the Mediterranean; 10 in the Baltic; and 3 at Constantinople. Fresh construction ensured that, despite losses, at least 120 submarines would be available for the rest of 1917. The campaign was initially a great success, nearly 500,000 tons of shipping being sunk in both February and March, and 860,000 tons in April, when Britain's supplies of wheat shrank to six weeks worth. In May losses exceeded 600,000 tons, and in June 700,000. Germany had lost only nine submarines in the first three months of the campaign.

On 1 February, near Gironde, a U-boat surfaced near the Romanian merchant București, the latter being armed with two 120 mm guns. A short artillery duel ensued, between the merchant's aft gun (manned by officer Ciocaș Mihail) and the submarine's deck gun. Eventually, a shell from the merchant's gun fell 50 meters away from the submarine, prompting the U-boat to submerge and retreat.

On 3 February, in response to the new submarine campaign, President Wilson severed all diplomatic relations with Germany, and the US Congress declared war on 6 April.

Allied response

The new policy of unrestricted submarine warfare was initially a success. In January 1917, prior to the campaign, Britain lost 49 ships; in February, after it opened, 105; and in March, 147. In March a full 25% of all Britain-bound shipping was sunk.

At first, the British Admiralty failed to respond effectively to the German offensive. Despite the proven success of troop convoys earlier in the war, the Channel convoys between England and France, and the Dutch, French, and Scandinavian convoys in the North Sea, they initially refused to consider widespread convoying or escorting. Convoying imposed severe delays on shipping, and was believed to be counterproductive, amounting to a loss of carrying capacity greater than the loss inflicted by the U-Boats. It was disliked by both merchant and naval captains, and derided as a defensive measure. It was not until 27 April that the Admiralty endorsed the convoy system, the first convoy sailing from Gibraltar on 10 May.

In April, US Rear Admiral William Sims arrived in London as US Naval Liaison. He was dismayed to be informed by the Admiralty that Germany would win the war if its submarines went unchecked, and cabled Washington to have USN destroyers despatched to Queenstown, Ireland, from where they were to patrol to the west.

As merchantmen from Allied countries were sunk, Brazilian ships took over routes that had been vacated. However, this led the Brazilian vessels into waters patrolled by U-boats. When coupled with Germany's policy of unrestricted submarine warfare, the result was that Brazilian ships were soon lost, which drove the country closer to declaring war on the Central Powers.

In May and June a regular system of transatlantic convoys were established, and after July the monthly losses never exceeded 500,000 tons, although they remained above 300,000 tons for the remainder of 1917. Convoying was an immediate success; on whichever routes it was introduced it resulted in a drop in shipping losses, with the U-boats seeking out easier prey. It also brought warships escorting the convoys in contact with attacking U-boats, leading to an increase in U-boats destroyed.
German submarine losses were between 5 and 10 each month, and they soon realised the need to increase production, even at the expense of building surface warships. However, production was delayed by labour and material shortages.

The Allied Maritime Transport Council was established on 3 November 1917, bringing together representatives from the British Empire, the United States, France and Italy to provide an 'international administration' for more efficient management of shipping. This initiative lead the civil action which complemented the naval action in response to the U-boat campaign, and which consisted of the efficient organisation of both shipping and of the distribution of supplies, such that the utility of every ton of imported goods was used to the maximum effectiveness.

1918: The last year
At the end of 1917 Allied shipping losses stood at over 6 million GRT for the year overall.
However monthly shipping losses had dropped to around 300,000 GRT, and never rose to the levels suffered in spring 1917.
With the establishment of a comprehensive convoy system, Allied shipping losses fell to non-critical levels, while U-boat losses increased alarmingly. From 48 boats lost in the years up to February 1917, a further 61 were lost by the end of the year.

The logical response to the convoy system, which concentrated forces for the defence, was to similarly concentrate the attacking force. The U-boat arm did not succeed in World War I in developing such a response.
They encountered several home-bound convoys and succeeded in sinking 3 ships, but at the loss of 2 of their number, including U-103, which was rammed by the troopship Olympic. Rucker had found it next to impossible to exercise control from his position at sea, and the loss ratio discouraged any further experiments.

U-cruisers
Late in the war, the German high command decided to take the submarine war to the coast of the US, using the large Type U-151 and Type U-139 U-boats. Seven Type U-151 and three Type U-139 had been built, the Type U-151 originally as large merchant U-boats for shipping material to and from locations otherwise denied German surface ships, such as the United States, and 6 Type U-151 were refitted for war duty in 1917. The Type U-139 were the largest U-boats of World War I.

American campaign
 departed Kiel on 14 April 1918 commanded by Korvettenkapitän Heinrich von Nostitz und Jänckendorff, her mission to attack American shipping. She arrived in Chesapeake Bay on 21 May where she laid mines off the Delaware capes, and cut the submerged telegraph cables which connected New York with Nova Scotia. On 25 May she stopped three US schooners off Virginia, took their crews prisoner, and sank the three ships by gunfire. On 2 June 1918, known to some historians as "Black Sunday", U-151 sank six US ships and damaged two others off the coast of New Jersey in the space of a few hours. The next day the tanker Herbert L. Pratt struck a mine previously laid by U-151 in the area but was later salvaged. Only 13 people died in the seven sinkings, their deaths caused by a capsized lifeboat.

Encouraged by the success of U-151, and the large Type 139, U-cruisers  were despatched on similar missions, but the US Navy was now ready for them, and the hunting was not as good.  was lost with all hands on the return voyage when she struck a mine off Bergen, Norway, on 25 September 1918. Another trio of long-range submarines, and U-cruiser  were making their way across the Atlantic in November 1918 when the war ended.

July 1918 witnessed the Attack on Orleans when a U-boat sunk four barges and a tugboat off the coast of Cape Cod Massachusetts by the town of Orleans. The U-boat fired on the town ineffectually for about an hour before it was fought off by two Navy planes. It was the first attack involving a foreign power's artillery against US soil since the Mexican–American War.

Final countermeasures
By 1918 the Allied anti-submarine measures had continued to become more effective.

Aircraft began to play an increasingly effective role in patrolling large areas quickly. While they had little effect when attacking (only one U-boat was confirmed as sunk by air attack) the presence of aircraft forced the U-boat to dive, becoming blind and immobile, or risk the air patrol summoning hunting warships to the scene. During 1918 no convoy escorted by air patrol lost a ship, and U-boats were forced increasingly to operate at night or beyond aircraft range.

In 1918 the USN embarked on a mammoth scheme to create a barrage across the routes exiting the North Sea. The North Sea Mine Barrage saw the laying of over 70,000 mines during the summer of 1918. From September to November 1918 6 U-boats were sunk by this measure.

The RN also developed the R-class submarine, designed as a hunter-killer vessel, with a high underwater speed and sophisticated hydrophone system. These came too late to see action, however, and no successes were recorded by them.

By the end of 1918, Allied shipping losses were 2¾ million GRT for the year overall (averaging 323,000 tons through March and declining thereafter) at a cost of 69 submarines, the U-boat Arm's worst year.

United States Navy in the Atlantic and Mediterranean
During the Great War United States Navy warships were deployed to both the Atlantic and Mediterranean with the primary objective of fighting German submarines and escorting convoys. American participation commenced with an event known as the "Return of the Mayflower", when the first six destroyers arrived at Queenstown, Ireland in May 1917. Despite their long journey, when asked when they would be ready to go on patrol, the squadron commander replied "We are ready now". Essentially all available American destroyers and much of the submarine force were deployed in 1917–18, with bases including Queenstown, Bantry Bay, the Azores, and other locations. Many contacts and attacks were made in the Atlantic and Mediterranean, though only two U-boats were sunk or disabled by American action. An American auxiliary cruiser heavily damaged a U-boat during the action of 4 April 1918. As a result, the Germans sailed directly for Spain where they scuttled their boat. American submarine chasers also engaged in one battle against Austro-Hungarian forces during the war. Though their participation in the conflict was intended as a counter-submarine effort, they were engaged by enemy shore batteries, charted a path through a minefield and helped sink two Austro-Hungarian destroyers at the naval base of Durazzo, Albania.

Japanese participation
Beginning in April 1917, Japan, an ally of the United Kingdom, sent a total of 14 destroyers to the Mediterranean with cruiser flagships which were based at Malta and played an important part in escorting convoys to guard them against enemy submarines. The Japanese ships were very effective in patrol and anti-submarine activity. However, of the 9 Austro-Hungarian navy submarines lost to enemy action, 5 were sunk by Italian navy units (U-13, U-10, U-16, U-20, and U-23), 1 by Italian and French units (U-30), 1 by Royal Navy units (U-3), while none were sunk by the Japanese navy, which lost one destroyer (torpedoed by U-27).

Brazilian participation
On 21 December 1917 the British government requested that a Brazilian naval force of light cruisers be placed under Royal Navy control and a squadron comprising the cruisers Rio Grande do Sul and Bahia, the destroyers Paraíba, Rio Grande do Norte, Piauí, and Santa Catarina, and the support ship Belmonte and the ocean-going tug Laurindo Pitta was formed, designated the Divisão Naval em Operações de Guerra ("Naval Division in War Operations"). The DNOG sailed on 31 July 1918 from Fernando de Noronha for Sierra Leone, arriving at Freetown on 9 August, and sailing onwards to its new base of operations, Dakar, on 23 August. On the night of 25 August the division believed it had been attacked by a U-boat when the auxiliary cruiser Belmonte sighted a torpedo track. The purported submarine was depth-charged, fired on, and reportedly sunk by the Rio Grande do Norte, but the sinking was never confirmed.

The DNOG patrolled the Dakar-Cape Verde-Gibraltar triangle, which was suspected to be used by U-boats waiting on convoys, until 3 November 1918 when it sailed for Gibraltar to begin operations in the Mediterranean, with the exception of the Rio Grande do Sul, Rio Grande do Norte, and Belmonte. The Division arrived at Gibraltar on 10 November; while passing through the Straits of Gibraltar, they mistook three USN subchasers for U-boats but no damage was caused.

Aftermath
By mid-1918, U-boat losses had reached unacceptable levels, and the morale of their crews had drastically deteriorated; by the autumn it became clear that the Central Powers could not win the war.

The Allies insisted that an essential precondition of any armistice was that Germany surrender all her submarines, and on 24 October 1918 all German U-boats were ordered to cease offensive operations and return to their home ports. The Allies stipulated that all seaworthy submarines were to be surrendered to them and those in shipyards be broken up.
More than 160 U-boats surrendered at Harwich, Essex in November 1918. Overseen by Rear Admiral Sir Reginald Tyrwhitt, commanding officer of the Harwich fleet, the German crews were loaded on to transport ships to be sent home without being allowed to set foot on British soil. Some of the U-boats were sent to places such as Liverpool or Brighton to be put on display whilst others were left on the beach.
The last significant role played by U-boats in World War I was the suppression of the German naval mutiny that same month, when they stood ready to "fire without warning on any vessel flying the red flag".

Summary

Allied and Neutral Tonnage sunk by U-boats in World War I

Grand Total 12,850,815 gross tons

Allied losses included 10 battleships, 18 cruisers and several smaller naval vessels.

Unrestricted submarine warfare was resumed in February 1917 and the British began full-scale convoying in September 1917. The heaviest losses were suffered in April 1917 when a record 881,027 tons were sunk by the U-boats.

150,000 tons of purely British shipping were lost in January 1917, and 300,000 tons in February; Allied and neutral losses increased in a similar proportion. In April 525,000 tons of British shipping were lost. In October 270,000 tons were lost, and in December 170,000 tons were lost. These totals are included in the above figures.

29 U-boat commanders were decorated with the Pour le Mérite, the highest German decoration for gallantry for officers. 12 U-boat crewmen received the Goldene Militär-Verdienst-Kreuz, the highest bravery award for non-commissioned officers and enlisted men.

The most successful U-boat commanders of World War I were Lothar von Arnauld de la Perière (189 merchant vessels and two gunboats with 446,708 tons), followed by Walter Forstmann (149 ships with 391,607 tons), and Max Valentiner (144 ships with 299,482 tons). So far, their records have never been surpassed by anyone in any later conflict.

Sir Joseph Maclay approved four standard designs of merchant ship and placed orders for over 1,000,000 tons of shipping (Britain launched 495,000 tons of shipping in the first half of 1917, but 850,000 tons were sunk in the first quarter alone; by 1918 3,000,000 tons a year were being launched).

German Submarine Force 1914–1918

 Total operational boats: 351
 Total sunk in combat: 178 (41 by mines, 30 by depth charges and 13 by Q-ships)
 Other losses: 39
 Completed after Armistice: 45
 Surrendered to Allies: 179
 Men lost in U-boats: 515 officers and 4894 enlisted men

References

Notes

Bibliography
 
 
 
 
 Grey, Edwyn (1972) The Killing Time Seeley 
 Grigg, John (2002) Lloyd George: War Leader, 1916–1918 Allen Lane, London. 
 
 
 Jane's Fighting Ships of World War I (1919, reprinted 1990) Studio Editions 
 Messimer, Dwight (2001) Find and Destroy Naval Institute 
 
 
 Tarrant, V. E. (1989) The U-Boat Offensive 1914–1945 Arms and Armour

Further reading

External links
 Abbatiello, John: Atlantic U-boat Campaign , in: 1914-1918-online. International Encyclopedia of the First World War.
 Karau, Mark D.: Submarines and Submarine Warfare , in: 1914-1918-online. International Encyclopedia of the First World War.
 World's Navies in World War 1, Campaigns, Battles, Warship losses
  "First Battle of the Atlantic" article.
 Photos of cruises of German submarine U-54 in 1916–1918.
 A 44 min. German film from 1917 about a cruise of the German submarine U-35.
 Uboat.net: Detailed information about German submarines.
 Room 40:  original documents, photos and maps about World War I German submarine warfare and British Room 40 Intelligence from The National Archives, Kew, Richmond, UK.
 Historical footage of U-boats in World War I, europeanfilmgateway.eu

 
Submarine warfare
.
.
Campaigns and theatres of World War I
Campaign World War I
.
.
.
.
.
Naval battles of World War I involving Brazil
.
.
.
Conflicts in 1914
Conflicts in 1915
Conflicts in 1916
Conflicts in 1917
Conflicts in 1918
Naval history of Germany
Austria-Hungary in World War I
German Empire in World War I
Japan in World War I
Italy in World War I
Brazil in World War I
Naval battles of World War I involving Russia
Naval battles involving Bulgaria
Naval battles involving Romania